Javornik is a village on the Una River, near the town Dvor, Banija region, Croatia. It is part of the Dvor municipality and its population was 107 at the 2011 census.

References

 Selo ostalo u "kamenom dobu": Nema telefona, roaminga, ceste, kanalizacije i vodovoda, ali jedne stvari imaju napretek 

Populated places in Sisak-Moslavina County